John Lawrence Finneran (August 10, 1938 – July 22, 1973), better known under his stage name Larry Finnegan (sometimes erroneously listed as "Larry Finneran"), was an American pop singer.

Born in New York City, Finnegan's only hit in the US was 1962's "Dear One", which went to No. 11 on the U.S. Billboard Hot 100, and climbed to No. 1 in Australia. The recording had sold one million copies by 1966, earning a gold disc.

In 1966 Finnegan moved to Sweden, where Dear One was a #1 hit in 1962 and he had more hits, for example "Oh, Lonesome me (peaked at #9), "Pretty Suzie Sunshine (peaked at #7) and "I like it like that" (peaked at #5).

Due to his great successes in Sweden, Finnegan visited the country for tours and became involved in the Swedish pop industry. The first result came already in 1963 when the Swedish-Dutch singer  (Martina Carina Peereboom) got her first hit with "Johnny Loves me" -  written and produced by him. The record spent 10 weeks at the best selling chart Kvällstoppen and peaked at #7. Her German version Johnny komm became a hit in Germany.

Larry Finnegan also made records of his songs in German, among others Komm doch zu mir, Tiger aus Papier, Sieben Tage, Einen Grüss an Mama, Glück und heisser Tränen, Unterm Dach and Das schönste Mädchen der Welt.

In 1966, he started his own record label SvenskAmerican, which published his own records – for example the singles "Good Morning Tears", (peaked at #7) and "Bound for Houston (peaked at #12) "Seven Days" (peaked at #4) – and also records with the Swedish group Sven-Ingvars.

Finnegan recorded several records in Swedish. The most successful was  "Maria, min vän" (Maria, my friend), which spent 15 weeks at the best selling chart Kvällstoppen peaking at #1 and "Hälsa hem till mamma" (Send your greetings to my mama), which peaked at #6. His Swedish pronunciation was as good as perfect, without any American accent.

His Pick up the pieces gave the Danish pop singer Bjørn Tidmand his big break in 1963, Brænd Mine Breve (Burn my letters), which peaked at #1. A Finnish version of the same song, Jätä minut jo rauhaan (Leave me alone) was a hit with the Finnish pop singer Marion Rung.
Larry Finnegan's songs have been recorded by many artists mainly in Scandinavia, Germany and the Netherlands. His discography includes 160 different versions: https://www.discogs.com/de/artist/573706-John-Finneran?page=1

Finnegan moved later to Switzerland, and in 1970 back to the United States.

He died of a brain tumor at age 34 in 1973.

Discography

Singles

References

1938 births
1973 deaths
American male pop singers
Singers from New York (state)
20th-century American singers
20th-century American male singers